Simplicistilus is a monotypic genus of African sheet weavers containing the single species, Simplicistilus tanuekes. It was first described by G. H. Locket in 1968, and has only been found in Central Africa.

See also
 List of Linyphiidae species (Q–Z)

References

Linyphiidae
Monotypic Araneomorphae genera
Spiders of Africa